Gaëlle Gebet (born 29 June 1984) is a French foil fencer, bronze medallist at the 2014 World Fencing Championships.

Career
Gebet took up fencing at the age of six at her local club in Beynes. She earned a bronze medal at the 2004 Junior World Championships in Plovdiv. In 2010, she was selected into the French national senior team that ranked 5th in the European Championships and the World Championships. The 2013–14 season saw her win a bronze medal both in the European Championships and the World Championships. The next season she climb her first individual World Cup podium with a bronze medal in Cancún.

Alongside her career as an athlete, Gebet is a police officer.

References

External links
Profile  at the European Fencing Confederation

1984 births
Living people
French female foil fencers
Sportspeople from Tours, France
Fencers at the 2015 European Games
European Games medalists in fencing
European Games silver medalists for France
21st-century French women